Mabin is a surname. Notable people with the surname include:

Dylan Mabin (born 1997), American football player
Greg Mabin (born 1994), American football player
Jordan Mabin (born 1988), American football player

See also
 Mabin language
 Maybin